Barry Austin Gusterson (born 24 October 1946) is a British pathologist who has been Professor of Pathology at the University of Glasgow since 2000 and Head of Forensic Medicine and Forensic Science, since 2006.  Prior to this he was Founding Director of the Toby Robins Breakthrough Breast Cancer Research Centre at the Institute of Cancer Research and Professor of Pathology and Head of the Section of Molecular Pathology at the Institute of Cancer Research.

Education
Gusterson was educated at Colchester Royal Grammar School and obtained a BSc in Physiology at St Bartholomew's Hospital. He then earned a dental degree at the Royal Dental Hospital and a medical degree at St Bartholomew’s Hospital. He also studied at the Institute for Cancer Research.  He obtained a PhD on opiate receptors at the Ludwig Institute, and his MRCPath, while training at the Royal Marsden Hospital.

Career
Gusterson held posts in medicine and surgery at St Bartholow’s Hospital and the Royal Devon and Exeter Hospital and was appointed as Professor of Histopathology at the Institute of Cancer Research and Consultant at the Royal Marsden Hospital in 1986. Whilst at the Institute he held a number of senior positions, including Chairman of the Section of Cell Biology and Experimental Pathology. He initiated the concept to build the first dedicated breast cancer research centre and was appointed Founding Director of the Toby Robins, Breakthrough Breast Cancer Research Centre in 1998. In 2000 he moved to Glasgow University, where he held a number of positions as Professor of Pathology, Head of Forensic Science and Medicine, initiator and Director of the Glasgow Biobank. As Associate Dean for Research in the Medical faculty and Head of Cancer Sciences he restructured cancer sciences, which brought Glasgow up to 4th in the UK in the Research Assessment Exercise. He chaired the pan-Glasgow pathology Committee that resulted in the unification of all pathology departments across Glasgow and Clyde into a new purpose built building at the Southern General Hospital.  Gusterson retired in 2011 and became a Trustee for Moorfield’s Eye Charity and a member of Council for St George's, University of London.

Research
Gusterson’s interests have been predominantly aimed at understanding the biology of head and neck cancer and breast cancer, with some earlier studies on soft tissue sarcomas. He has studied  normal breast and breast development.  Since retiring his research interests continue in these areas.

Gusterson initiated two cancer centres, which developed as major fund-raising projects in which he played a key role as the clinical lead. These resulted in the building of the Toby Robins Breakthrough Breast Cancer Research Centre at the Institute of Cancer Research in London and the Wolfson Wohl Cancer Research Centre at Glasgow University.

Notes

External links
 Prof. Barry Gusterson at the University of Glasgow, Cancer Sciences, Pathology and Gene Regulation Research department. 

1946 births
Living people
British pathologists
People educated at Colchester Royal Grammar School
Fellows of the Royal College of Pathologists